The Office of Comptroller of New York City, a position established in 1801, is the chief financial officer and chief auditor of the city agencies and their performance and spending. The comptroller also reviews all city contracts, handles the settlement of litigation claims (amounting to $975 million in 2019), issues municipal bonds, and manages the city's very large pension funds ($240 billion in assets under management as of 2020).

The comptroller is elected citywide to a four-year term, and can hold office for two consecutive terms. As of 2021, the comptroller had a staff of 800 people, and a budget of over $100 million. If vacancies were to occur simultaneously in the offices of Mayor of New York City and New York City Public Advocate, the comptroller would become acting mayor.

The current comptroller is Democrat Brad Lander. He  was elected in 2021.

Duties and staff
The comptroller is responsible for auditing the performance and finances of city agencies, making recommendations regarding proposed contracts, issuing reports on the state of the city economy, marketing and selling municipal bonds, and managing city debt. The Comptroller also "is the custodian and investment advisor to the Boards" of the five pension funds of the city, which are collectively referred to as "NYC Public Pension Funds" or "New York City pension funds". The comptroller's regulations are compiled in Title 44 of the New York City Rules.

If vacancies should simultaneously occur in the offices of Mayor of New York City and New York City Public Advocate (formerly president of the city council or board of aldermen), the comptroller would become acting mayor. The comptroller serves as a check on the mayor, and is arguably the second most important elected official in New York City after the mayor. 

As of 2021, the comptroller had a staff of 800 people, and a budget of over $100 million.

History

1801–present
The office was created as an appointive office in 1801 by the New York City Common Council. On September 6, 1802, after a tie vote by the New York City Common Council Committee on whether to pass an ordinance for the appointment of a comptroller with a salary of $1,500 ($ in current dollar terms), the ordinance was adopted by the Recorder, John B Prevost, Esquire, casting a vote in favor. Thirty years later, the Comptroller became head of the Department of Finance. In 1884 the office became elective, and in 1938 the comptroller became head of a separate, independent department of the city's government. No Republican has been elected comptroller since 1938.

The comptroller served on the eight-member New York City Board of Estimate, created in 1873, until the board was held unconstitutional in a unanimous decision by the US Supreme Court in 1989 in Board of Estimate of City of New York v. Morris. The board was composed of the Mayor of New York City, the comptroller, and the president of the New York City Council, each of whom was elected citywide and had four votes, and the five borough presidents, each having two votes, despite the differing population sizes of each borough. That construct was held by the US Supreme Court to violate the principle of one person, one vote. The Board of Estimate was then abolished.

In fiscal year 2019, the comptroller resolved 13,712 claims and lawsuits against New York City for $975 million. The Comptroller also issued 61 audits and special reports on the effectiveness and service quality of city programs, as well as on financial issues, identifying actual and potential revenue and savings.

2009 election

The Democratic nominee in the 2009 general election, John Liu, won 76% of the citywide vote on November 3. The Republican nominee, Joseph Mendola, won 19%; the Conservative nominee, Stuart Avrick, 2%; and others 2%.

2013 election

Manhattan Borough President Scott Stringer won the September 10, 2013, Democratic primary with 52% of the vote, defeating former New York State Governor Eliot Spitzer, who had been forced to resign as governor over various scandals and who received 48% of the vote. Former Wall Street financier John Burnett was unopposed as the Republican candidate. Hesham El-Meligy, an independent candidate with the support of some Libertarians, was also a candidate for the office. Stringer won the general election with 80% of the vote, as Burnett had 17% of the vote, the Green Party's Julia Willebrand had 2% of the vote, and El-Meligy had 0.5% of the vote.

2017 election
In 2017, there was no Democratic primary for the position. Stringer faced Republican Michel Faulkner in the general election, and won, with 77% of the vote.

2021 election

The 2021 New York City Comptroller election consisted of Democratic and Republican primaries on June 22, 2021, followed by a general election on November 2, 2021.  The primaries were the first Comptroller election primaries to use ranked-choice voting. Incumbent Comptroller Scott Stringer was barred from running for a third term by term limits. 

Notable candidates included State Senator Brian Benjamin, former US Marine Zach Iscol, City Councilmember Brad Lander, State Senator Kevin Parker, and State Assemblymember David Weprin. A number of other members of the New York City business and political communities also ran.

Comptrollers

Pre-consolidation (1898)
1802–1805 Selah Strong 
1805–1806 Benjamin Romaind
1806–1807 Isaac Stoutenburg
1807 Jacob Morton
1808–1813 Garret N. Bleecker
1813–1816 Thomas Mercein    
1816–1831 Garret N. Bleecker
1831–1836 Talman J. Waters
1836–1839 Douw D. Williamson
1839–1842 Alfred A. Smith
1842 Douw D. Williamson
1843–1844 Alfred A. Smith
1844–1845 Douw D. Williamson   
1845–1848 John Ewen
1848–1849 Talman J. Waters
1849 John L. Lawrence
1850–1853 Joseph R. Taylor
1853–1859 Azariah C. Flagg
1859–1863 Robert T. Haws
1863–1867 Matthew T. Brennan
1867–1871 Richard B. Connolly
1871–1876 Andrew H. Green
1876–1881 John Kelly
1881–1883 Allan Campbell
1883–1884 S. Hastings Grant
1884–1888 Edward V. Loss 
1888–1894 Theodore W. Myers
1894–1898 Ashbel P. Fitch

Post-consolidation (1898)

1898–1901 Bird S. Coler
1902–1905 Edward M. Grout
1906–1909 Herman A. Metz
1910–1917 William A. Prendergast
1918–1925 Charles Lacy Craig
1926–1932 Charles W. Berry
1933 George McAneny
1934 W. Arthur Cunningham
1935 Joseph D. McGoldrick
1936–1937 Frank J. Taylor
1938–1945 Joseph D. McGoldrick
1946–1953 Lazarus Joseph
1954–1961 Lawrence E. Gerosa
1962–1965 Abraham D. Beame
1966–1969 Mario Procaccino
1970–1973 Abraham D. Beame
1974–1989 Harrison J. Goldin
1990–1993 Elizabeth Holtzman
1994–2001 Alan G. Hevesi
2002–2009 William Thompson
2010–2013 John Liu
2014–2021 Scott Stringer
2022–present Brad Lander

References

Sources
Article on "comptroller" by Noel C. Garelick in The Encyclopedia of New York City, edited by Kenneth T. Jackson (Yale University Press and The New-York Historical Society, New Haven, Connecticut, 1995)

External links

New York City Office of the Comptroller
Comptroller in the Rules of the City of New York

 
Comptroller
Politicians from New York City